Cynthesis is a progressive metal band from California that was formed by former Zero Hour members Jasun Tipton, Troy Tipton, Erik Rosvold and Enchant drummer Sean Flanagan. Vocalist Erik Rosvold sang on Zero Hour's first two studio albums, Metamorphosis and The Towers of Avarice before leaving the band.  The first Cynthesis album, DeEvolution, saw him recording for the first time in over 10 years. The follow-up to DeEvolution, ReEvolution, came out in 2013.

References

American progressive metal musical groups
Heavy metal musical groups from California
Musical groups established in 2010
Pleasanton, California
2010 establishments in California